Farmington Historic District may refer to:

(by state, then city/town)
Farmington Historic District (Farmington, Connecticut), listed on the National Register of Historic Places (NRHP) in Hartford County
Farmington Historic District (Farmington, Maine), NRHP-listed in Franklin County
Farmington Historic District (Farmington, Michigan), NRHP-listed in Oakland County
Farmington Historic District (Farmington, North Carolina), NRHP-listed in Davie County
Farmington Main Street Historic District, Farmington, Utah, NRHP-listed in Davis County

See also
Farmington (disambiguation)